René Bonino (14 January 1930 – 17 August 2016) was a French sprinter who competed in the 1952 and 1956 Summer Olympics. He died on 18 August 2016 at the age of 86 .

Competition record

References

1930 births
2016 deaths
French male sprinters
Olympic athletes of France
Athletes (track and field) at the 1952 Summer Olympics
Athletes (track and field) at the 1956 Summer Olympics
European Athletics Championships medalists